Launched by the Dubai Mercantile Exchange (DME) on 1 June 2007, the DME Oman Crude Oil Futures Contract (OQD) is the Asian crude oil pricing benchmark. The contract is traded on the CME Group’s electronic platform CME Globex, and cleared through CME Clearport.

Contract specifications

Statistics

*: the exchanged opened on 1 June 2007.

DME Oman linked contracts
On 5 December 2010, NYMEX launched six DME Oman-linked contracts, traded bilaterally and cleared through CME Clearport. These new DME Oman-linked contracts complement the OQD Futures contract and give market participants regulated and transparent Over-The-Counter (OTC) contracts. 
The contracts are: 
 DME Oman Crude Oil Swap Futures (DOO)
 DME Oman Crude Oil BALMO Swap Futures (DOB)
 ICE Brent vs. DME Oman Crude Oil Swap Futures (DBO)
 DME Oman Crude Oil Average Price Option (DOA)
 Singapore MOGAS 92 Unleaded (Platts) vs. DME Oman Crude Oil Swap Futures (DNB)
 Singapore Gasoil (Platts) vs. DME Oman Crude Oil Swap Future (DZB)
The two main contracts which traded immediately were the DOO and the DOB with over  traded in the first week of their launch.

See also
 West Texas Intermediate
 Dubai Mercantile Exchange
 CME Group	
 Chicago Mercantile Exchange
 NYMEX
 Petroleum Development of Oman	
 Commodity Futures Trading Commission
 Dubai Financial Services Authority
 List of futures exchanges
 List of traded commodities

External links
 DME website
 CME Group website
 DFSA Website

Benchmark crude oils
Stock exchanges in the United Arab Emirates